Taiwanese entertainer Jolin Tsai has been featured in two feature films, five micro films, and eight television programs. In 2001, Tsai made her acting debut as a leading role in the television show Jacky Go Go Go episode, Catcher, which was directed by Huang Chun-hua. In the same year, she made a cameo appearance in the television series, Six Friends, which was directed by Ma Kung-wei. Her next television series, Come to My Place, directed by Doze Niu, and In Love, directed by Ouyang Sheng and Chang Chih-chao, were released in 2002. Tsai followed it with a leading role in the television series, Hi Working Girl (2003), which was directed by Huang Ko-i and Wu Ssu-ta. In 2005, Tsai played the leading role in the television show Juguang Garden episode, We Are the Champions, which was directed by Kao Tien-lung.

To further promote her studio album in 2007, Tsai played the title role in the film, Agent J, which was directed by Jeff Chang, Kuang Sheng, and Lai Wei-kang. In 2013, she featured in the micro film series, Take the Happy Home, which was directed by Wu Jiayang, and she further featured in the series in the next three years. In 2014, she featured in the micro film, Make a Wish, which was directed by Shih Hsiang-te. In 2014, Tsai featured as a judge in the Chinese singing reality competition television series, Rising Star. In 2016, Tsai joined the voice cast of Disney animated film, Zootopia, which was directed by Byron Howard and Rich Moore. She voiced Judy Hopps who is a newly appointed member of the Zootopia Police Department in the film's Taiwanese version. In 2019, Tsai featured as a coach in the Chinese boy group survival reality television series, Youth with You.

Feature films

Micro films

Television

References

External links 
 

Actress filmographies
Filmography
Taiwanese filmographies